This article lists the major power stations located in Ningxia province.

Non-renewable

Coal-based

Renewable

Hydroelectric

Conventional

References 

Power stations
Ningxia